The Round Houses in Moscow are nine-floors residential buildings built circularly, in Western Moscow in 1970, according to a project by architect Yevgeny Stamo and engineer Aleksandr Markelov.

They were built in a very different design from the regular "panel block" houses of that era.

The diameter of the structure is 155 meters (around 500 feet). It has 26 entrances, 913 apartments and six big archways to enter the courtyard. The first floor of the building contained pharmacies, shops, hair salons, a laundry and tailor shop, also a children's club, and even a library. The isolated courtyard has its own park, with playgrounds for kids and feels like it is a long way away from the busy town. The rooms here are not rectangular but more like trapezoids, which makes it harder to place furniture.

Also the courtyard has bad acoustics – a small noise echoes a lot, it bounces from the walls making it noisy at night if something is happening in the courtyard.

History 
The two younger architects, Stamo and Markelov wanted to design their own housing project to diversify from the typical Soviet planned architecture.

The main communist architectural authority and the Moscow Mosproject-1 institute let them step out from the standard solutions and make a round building.

In 1972, the construction of the huge accommodation building was completed. It made a big impression on the people of Moscow and of all the USSR, and for a long time there was an urban legend that the houses were built for the Moscow Olympics and that a whole block of such buildings was designed in the shape of the Olympic rings. According to Sergei Tekchenko, former head of the Moscow General Plan Institute, this version was distributed in the press for no reason: first, round houses seized too much land, and secondly, they turned out to be less cost-effective than standard buildings.

The costs increased due to the need for constant monitoring of a single project, in addition, such houses required monolithic additions, which increased the cost of the construction and the duration of its construction. The real idea of the project was to try to restore the "old Soviet residential yard", to add attractiveness to the typical built-up areas and to provide the residents the necessary infrastructures within walking distance. Thus, the first floor of the building was reserved for facilities such as shops, pharmacies and a library.

The building is in Nzhinskaya Street contains 913 apartments on 26 entrances.

In 1979, a second house was built in Dovzhenko Street with 26 entrances again but with 936 apartments. It was built near the Mosfilm Studios, the Houses has often appeared in Soviet films and the best apartments were given away to the actors of the cinema and theater.

After a few years, the disadvantages of this form of building became apparent: a strong wind was constantly blowing inside the yard, there were very loud voices and a significant portion of the apartments did not meet the required insulation standards. Repairs in the apartments are difficult to make due to the trapezoidal shape of the rooms and often residents and guests have difficulty finding the right entrances.

As a result, after the construction of the house on Dovzhenko Street was completed, no such buildings were built.  Despite all the weaknesses of the project, after about half a century, architectural scholars call it a project that preceded its time and paralleled it to the modern headquarters of Apple Inc. in California (Apple Park).

Former Moscow Chief Architect Mikhail Posokhin praised Yevgeny Stamo's contribution to the urban landscape and placed him alongside architects such as Vasily Bazhanov and Alexei Shchosev who also contributed to Moscow's urban landscape.

Gallery

References

Notes

External links 
 Video on the house at Nzhinskaya street
 Video on Vesti Moscow channel

Buildings and structures in Moscow
Coordinates on Wikidata
Round buildings
1970 establishments in Russia